The discography of the English-Canadian girl group All Saints consists of five studio albums, two compilation albums, one remix album, two video albums and 18 singles between London Records and Parlophone Records.

After the two promotional single-only releases "Silver Shadow" and "Let's Get Started" as All Saints 1.9.7.5., All Saints renamed, reformed and released their debut single "I Know Where It's At" in 1997 via London Records and reached number four on the UK Singles Chart. Their second single "Never Ever" was released in November 1997, and introduced the group to international success, reaching the top ten in several countries as well as peaking at number-one in the United Kingdom and Australia. It sold over 1.2 million copies in the UK and was eventually certified double platinum by the British Phonographic Industry. In 1998 the group won two BRIT Awards for Best British Single and Best British Video, both for "Never Ever". The group released their self-titled debut album All Saints in October 1997. It reached number two in the UK and was certified five-times platinum by the BPI for sales of 1.5 million. While, "If You Want to Party (I Found Lovin')" has been released in Japan only, their third single from the album was "Lady Marmalade", soon re-released as a double A-side with "Under the Bridge", which became their second and third UK number-one single in May 1998, earning a gold certification for 400,000 copies sold. The same month, the album was re-released with a slightly different track listing. "Bootie Call", the fourth single, sixth overall, also went to number-one, and the silver-certified "War of Nerves" (the fifth and final release) peaked at number seven, selling 200,000 copies. The album achieved success in countries such as Australia (double platinum, selling 140,000 copies), Canada (triple platinum, 300,000 copies), and the United States, where All Saints was certified platinum by the RIAA for sales of one million and produced two top 40 singles on the Billboard Hot 100: "I Know Where It's At" and "Never Ever".

All Saints returned in February 2000 with the single "Pure Shores", written by Shaznay Lewis and William Orbit for the soundtrack of the film The Beach (starring Leonardo DiCaprio). "Pure Shores" was their fifth number-one single in the UK and the second best-selling single of 2000, with 600,000 copies sold; it also became their first and only number-one single in Ireland and was a substantial hit across Europe and Australia. The song won an Ivor Novello Award for Most Performed Work. All Saints performed the song at the 2000 MTV Europe Music Awards. In October 2000, All Saints released the single "Black Coffee", which became their sixth and final number-one single in the UK, selling 200,000 copies. This preceded their second studio album, Saints & Sinners, which debuted at number one on the UK Albums Chart, eventually reaching double-platinum certification in the UK for sales of 600,000 copies. The third and final single was "All Hooked Up" in January 2001, which peaked at number seven. In February 2001, All Saints announced that they were to take a break so that they "could clear the air" between themselves. Melanie Blatt said later that year that it was uncertain if they would reform, citing their difficulties with the financial and business aspects of the group. Shaznay Lewis later explained that the catalyst for the break-up was a disagreement over who would wear a certain jacket for a photo shoot: "I would never in a million years have put money on the group ending over a jacket incident. But when that incident happened, it fired up so strong, it had to be over. And the way I was then, the state we'd got into then, there was no way she was getting that stupid jacket." In November 2001, London Records released a greatest hits compilation entitled All Hits.

On 24 January 2006, it was announced that the band had reformed and signed a record deal with Parlophone. They subsequently began work on their third studio album, Studio 1. The first single, "Rock Steady" (released in November 2006), reached number three on the UK Singles Chart. Studio 1 entered the albums chart at number forty, falling significantly short of the success of "Rock Steady" and the group's previous releases; it has since sold 100,000 copies according to the BPI, being certified gold. A second single, "Chick Fit", followed in February 2007, but promotional appearances and a physical release were cancelled and it failed to reach the top 200. It was subsequently reported that All Saints and Parlophone had parted ways and the group cancelled their planned UK tour. Despite Melanie Blatt confirming that the group would never reform again in a 2009 interview, All Saints reformed in 2013 to support Backstreet Boys for five dates in their UK tour a year later. Due to the success of the tour, the band announced on 27 January 2016 that they were releasing their first new album in ten years titled Red Flag, which was released on 8 April 2016, with "One Strike" issued as the lead single for the album.

Albums

Studio albums

Compilation albums

Video albums

Singles

Promotional singles

Music videos

Other appearances
"Girls on Film", on Trevor Horn Reimagines the Eighties

References

Discography
Pop music group discographies
Discographies of British artists